Haerts is the debut studio album by American indie pop band Haerts, released on October 27, 2014 by Columbia Records. The album was produced by Haerts and Jean-Philip Grobler (better known as St. Lucia), with additional production from Andy Baldwin. It features three songs that were previously released on the band's debut extended play, Hemiplegia, which was released on October 8, 2013.

Promotion
Haerts embarked on a small promotional tour around North America in mid-2014. They performed already released music from their first EP Hemiplagia, and unreleased music from their then-upcoming debut album. On September 2, 2014, the band released the first single from their album, "Giving Up", with an accompanying music video on October 30, 2014.

The band has embarked on a US tour hitting New York City, Los Angeles, Washington, D.C., Philadelphia, San Francisco, and several other cities, starting on November 7 until December 20, 2014.

Track listing

Charts

References

2014 debut albums
Columbia Records albums
Haerts albums